Aldo Ronconi (20 September 1918 – 12 June 2012) was an Italian professional road bicycle racer.

Ronconi was born at Brisighella, Ravenna, Italy.  He was professional from 1940 to 1952 where he won 5 victories. He finished fourth overall in his first Tour de France where he won a stage and wore the yellow jersey for 2 days. He also won a stage in the 1946 Giro d'Italia. He owned a bicycle goods and sports shop in Faenza, Italy, and died in Faenza, aged 93.

Major results

1937
 8th Giro dell'Appennino
1939
 1st Overall Milano–Munchen
1st Stage 2
1940
 1st Giro dell'Umbria
 8th Giro dell'Emilia
 10th Milan–San Remo
1942
 7th Giro di Lombardia
 10th Giro del Veneto
1946
 1st  Road race, National Road Championships
 1st Giro di Toscana
 3rd Overall Tour de Suisse
 3rd Trofeo Matteotti
 5th Overall Giro d'Italia
1st Stage 15
1947
 2nd Gran Piemonte
 3rd Giro di Romagna
 4th Overall Tour de France
1st Stage 3
Held  for two stages
 5th Giro dell'Emilia
1949
 2nd Overall Giro dei Tre Mari
1st Stages 2 & 6
 3rd Giro di Romagna
1950
 3rd Overall Tour de Suisse
 5th Giro del Ticino
 6th Giro di Romagna

References

External links 

Official Tour de France results for Aldo Ronconi

1918 births
2012 deaths
Italian male cyclists
Italian Tour de France stage winners
Italian Giro d'Italia stage winners
Sportspeople from the Province of Ravenna
Cyclists from Emilia-Romagna